Mirador is a 1997 album by the band Tarnation, which was led by Paula Frazer. It was released on 4AD in the UK and Europe, and on Reprise/Warner Bros. Records in the US. The American edition features a different album cover from the European version.

Track listing

References

1997 albums
Tarnation (band) albums
4AD albums
Reprise Records albums